Cooch Behar Polytechnic , established in 1964,  is a government polytechnic located in Keshab Road,  Cooch Behar, West Bengal. This polytechnic is affiliated to the West Bengal State Council of Technical Education,  and recognised by AICTE, New Delhi. This polytechnic offers diploma courses in Electrical, Automobile, Mechanical  and Civil Engineering.

Departments 

Engineering

Pharmacy

Library & Centers
In the college there is a library. The students can issue trade wise text books for certain period of time.

See also
 Government Industrial Training Institute Coochbehar

References

External links
 Admission to Polytechnics in West Bengal for Academic Session 2006-2007
http://coochbehar.nic.in/COB-Polytechnic.html#institute

Universities and colleges in Cooch Behar district
Educational institutions established in 1964
1964 establishments in West Bengal
Technical universities and colleges in West Bengal
Cooch Behar